Panagyurishte Nunatak (Nunatak Panagyurishte \'nu-na-tak pa-na-'gyu-ri-shte\) is a rocky peak of elevation 150 m projecting from Yakoruda Glacier, Greenwich Island in the South Shetland Islands, Antarctica.  The peak is named after the town of Panagyurishte in central Bulgaria.

Location

Maps
 L.L. Ivanov et al. Antarctica: Livingston Island and Greenwich Island, South Shetland Islands. Scale 1:100000 topographic map. Sofia: Antarctic Place-names Commission of Bulgaria, 2005.
 L.L. Ivanov. Antarctica: Livingston Island and Greenwich, Robert, Snow and Smith Islands. Scale 1:120000 topographic map.  Troyan: Manfred Wörner Foundation, 2009.

External links
 Panagyurishte Nunatak. SCAR Composite Antarctic Gazetteer
 Bulgarian Antarctic Gazetteer. Antarctic Place-names Commission. (details in Bulgarian, basic data in English)

External links
 Panagyurishte Nunatak. Copernix satellite image

Nunataks of Greenwich Island